Francisca Gawugah (born 7th January 1993) known by the stage name Sista Afia, is a Ghanaian  singer and songwriter from Accra. She gained recognition following the release of her single "Jeje", which features dancehall artist Shatta Wale and Afezi Perry.

Early life and career
Sista Afia is an Afro-pop musician, and the niece of Ghanaian Bishop Nicholas Duncan-Williams. She grew up in Accra and Kumasi. She attended Reverend John Teye Memorial Institute before relocating to the UK to further in nursing.

Sista Afia returned to Ghana in 2015 to start her music career. She took inspiration from musician Bisa Kdei and collaborated on the song 'Kro Kro No'.

Controversies
Sista Afia engaged in a physical banter with rapper Freda Rhymz after a lyrical banter.

Singles

Awards and nominations

Videography

References

1993 births
Living people
Ghanaian highlife musicians
Musicians from Accra
21st-century Ghanaian women singers
21st-century Ghanaian singers